Confusion Island is an island  long at the west side of the entrance to Clowes Bay, off the south side of Signy Island.

The southern point of the island was charted and named Confusion Point by Discovery Investigations personnel on the Discovery II in 1933.

The UK Antarctic Place-Names Committee altered the name in 1974, extending the application to the entire island.

See also 
 List of antarctic and sub-antarctic islands

References 

Islands of the South Orkney Islands